Devi S. is an Indian dubbing artist and actress who works in Malayalam films and television serials.

She became popular through the main character Kunjipengal she played in Oru Kudayum Kunju Pengalum, a serial on Doordarshan. She has dubbed for around 500 movies and acted in more than 25 movies. She received the National Film Award for Best Non-Feature Film Narration / Voice Over in the Non Feature Film Category in 2014 for Nithya Kalyani – Oru Mohiniyattam Patham. Currently, she has dubbed for more than 100 television soap operas.

Personal life
She is married to Alwin, an engineer. The couple has a daughter, Aathmaja.

Awards

National Film Awards
 2014 - National Film Award for Best Non-Feature Film Narration / Voice Over  - Nithyakalyani oru Mohiniyatta padam      
 Kerala State Film Awards  
 2021-Best Dubbing Artist(Female)-Drishyam 2

Kerala State Television Awards
 2012 -Best Dubbing Artist(s)- Male/Female Voice  - Ramayanam, Swavinte Makal
 2009 -Best Dubbing Artist(s)- Male/Female Voice  - Aranazhikaneram
 1993 - Best Child Artist - Oru kudayum kunjupengalum

Kerala Film Critics Awards
 2010 - Best Dubbing Artist - Karayilekku Oru Kadal Dooram

Asianet Television Awards
 2013 - Best Dubbing Artist - Kumkumapoovu
 2014 - Best Dubbing Artist - Sthreedhanam
 2016 - Best Dubbing Artist - Sthreedhanam, Parasparam
 2017 - Best Dubbing Artist - Vanambadi, Parasparam, Bharya
2019-Best Dubbing Artist - Vanambadi, Kasthooriman
Youth Rathna Awards 
 2011 - Best Dubbing - Traffic, Beautiful

Filmography

As actress

 Arayannangalude Veedu (2000)
 Kottaram Veettile Apputtan (1998)
 Aniyathi 
 Saadaram (1996)
 Samooham (1993)
 Daivathinte Vikrithikal (1992)

As Dubbing artist

Television

As actress
 Annathe Naadakam 
 Oru Kudayum Kunju Pengalum (DD)
 Velubhanu Circus
 Mahathma Gandhi Colony

Other roles
 Flowers Oru Kodi - as Participant

As dubbing artist

References

Actresses in Malayalam cinema
Indian film actresses
Living people
Year of birth missing (living people)
Indian voice actresses
Actresses from Thiruvananthapuram
Indian television actresses
Actresses in Malayalam television
20th-century Indian actresses
21st-century Indian actresses
Actresses in Hindi television
Child actresses in Malayalam cinema